Eva Perón: The True Story, also known simply as Eva Perón, is a 1996 Argentine historical-biographical drama film directed by Juan Carlos Desanzo and starring Esther Goris and Víctor Laplace. It was written by José Pablo Feinmann, based on the life of Eva Perón. It was released on 24 October 1996, and won 3 "Cóndor" awards by the Argentine Film Critics Association in 1997, including Best Original Screenplay and Best Actress for Goris.

The film was selected as the Argentine entry for the Best Foreign Language Film at the 69th Academy Awards, but was not accepted as a nominee.

Synopsis
The narration does not follow a chronologically linear interpretation of the full life of Eva Perón. Instead, it focuses on the political disputes during the last year of Eva's life. These disputes involved women's suffrage in Argentina, failed coup attempts against the Peronist government, and Eva's failed bid for the vice presidency. The story concludes with Eva's death in 1952.

Cast
 Esther Goris (Eva Perón)
 Víctor Laplace (Juan Domingo Perón)
 Cristina Banegas (Juana Ibarguren, Evita's mother)
 Pepe Novoa (Gral. Franklin Lucero)
 Irma Córdoba (Mercedes Ortiz de Achával Junco)
 Lorenzo Quinteros (Gral. Eduardo Lonardi)
 Tony Vilas (Gral. Edelmiro Farrell)
 Jorge Petraglia (Bishop)
 Enrique Liporace (Raúl Apold)
 Tony Lestingi (Alejandro Achával Junco)
 Leandro Regúnaga (José Espejo)
 Fernando Sureda (Armando Cabo)
 Danilo Devizia (Enrique Santos Discépolo)
 Carlos Roffé (Gral. Ángel Solari)
 Jean Pierre Reguerraz (Gral. Benjamín Menéndez)
 Miguel Tarditti (Américo Ghioldi)
 Francisco Nápoli (Arturo Frondizi)
 Horacio Roca (Paco Jamandreu)
 Regina Lamm (Guillermina Bunge de Moreno)
 Ariel Bonomi (Julio Álvarez)
 Luis Herrera (John William Cooke)
 Joselo Bella (Hernán Benítez)
 Eduardo Ruderman (Héctor Cámpora)
 Ramón Acuña (Presidential chauffeur)
 Fernando Álvarez (Senior worker)
 Mario Barreiro (Peronist worker)
 Hugo Álvarez (Socialist worker)
 Lindor Bressan (Casa Rosada military man)
 Raúl Florido (Casa Rosada military man)
 Inés Flomenbaum (Nurse)
 Pedro Mansilla (Radio drama actor)
 Ernesto Catalán (Radio drama sound engineer)
 Manuel Rosón (Wake ceremony man)
 Florencia Sztajn (Evita as a child)
 Darío Contartesi (Juan Duarte as a child)
 Carla Damico (Blanca Duarte)
 Gabriela López (Elisa Duarte)
 Jorge García Marino (Minister)
 Luis Mazzeo (Military officer jeep)
 Jovita Dieguez (Woman Foundation)
 Inés Rey (Old woman health institution)
 Martín Coria (Printing house worker)
 Nora Mercado (Woman radio)
 Pablo Carnaghi (Florencio Soto)
 Julio Pozueta (Isaías Santín)
 Enrique Flynn (Wake ceremony young man)
 Javier Faur
 Valeria Lorca
 Rosa Albina Ibáñez
 Adriana Pérez Gianny
 Roberto Fratantoni

Reception
Lisa Alspector of the Chicago Reader favoured Goris' "riveting" portrayal of Evita over that of Madonna in the American film, Evita (1996), based on the musical. Alspectot described the Argentine film as "an effective character study with plenty of subtext." She also stated that "it's fascinating to watch Goris and Victor Laplace (as Juan Peron) demystify sensationalized figures." She praised the greater emphasis on politics rather than Eva's brief acting career and felt the title character engaged viewers so that "you're compelled to ponder her complex motivations throughout."

Awards and nominations
Argentinean Film Critics Association Awards
Best Actress (Mejor Actriz) – Esther Goris (WON)
Best Art Direction (Mejor Dirección Artística) – Miguel Ángel Lumaldo (WON)
Best Screenplay, Original (Mejor Guión Original – José Pablo Feinmann  (WON)
Best Cinematography (Mejor Fotografía) – Juan Carlos Lenardi (nomination)
Best Director (Mejor Director) – Juan Carlos Desanzo (nomination)
Best Film (Mejor Película) – (nomination)
Best Music (Mejor Música) – José Luis Castiñeira de Dios (nomination)

Biarritz International Festival of Latin American Cinema
Audience Award – Juan Carlos Desanzo (nomination)

See also
 List of submissions to the 69th Academy Awards for Best Foreign Language Film
 List of Argentine submissions for the Academy Award for Best Foreign Language Film

References

External links
 
 Eva Peron: The True Story at Cine Nacional 

Cultural depictions of Eva Perón
Argentine drama films
1990s Spanish-language films
Films set in the 1940s
Films set in the 1950s
1990s political drama films
1996 films
Biographical films about actors